ROKS Jinhae (PCC-766) was a  of the Republic of Korea Navy.

Development and design 

The Pohang class is a series of corvettes built by different Korean shipbuilding companies. The class consists of 24 ships and some after decommissioning were sold or given to other countries. There are five different types of designs in the class from Flight II to Flight VI.

Construction and career 
Jinhae was launched on 18 March 1987 by Hanjin Heavy Industries in Busan. The vessel was commissioned on 30 September 1988 and decommissioned on 27 December 2017.

Gallery

References
 

Ships built by Hanjin Heavy Industries
Pohang-class corvettes
1987 ships